Thomas Hundertpfund (born 14 December 1989) is an Austrian professional ice hockey left wing who currently plays for EC KAC in the ICE Hockey League (ICEHL).  He previously participated in international competition for Austria and played for EC KAC in the EBEL from 2007 to 2013. Hundertpfund spent the 2013–14 season abroad in Sweden with Timrå IK of the HockeyAllsvenskan, before returning to Klagenfurt on 8 July 2014.

Career statistics

Regular season and playoffs

International

References

External links

1989 births
Living people
Austrian ice hockey left wingers
Ice hockey players at the 2014 Winter Olympics
EC KAC players
Olympic ice hockey players of Austria
Sportspeople from Klagenfurt
Timrå IK players